General elections were held in the Netherlands on 5 and 15 June 1917 to elect members of the House of Representatives of the Dutch Parliament. The elections were held following an agreement between the seven political parties with seats in parliament to allow a change in the constitution to introduce universal male suffrage and proportional representation. Polling was held for 50 constituencies with only one candidate on 5 June, in which 50 MPs were elected. In the other 50 constituencies with opposition candidates, voting was held on 15 July. A second round was required in Amsterdam, where Social Democratic Workers' Party candidate Adriaan Gerhard was re-elected.

1,078,205 citizens were eligible to vote of which 230,310 cast a vote, representing a turnout of 21.36%.

Results

References

General elections in the Netherlands
Netherlands
1917 in the Netherlands
June 1917 events
Election and referendum articles with incomplete results
1917 elections in the Netherlands